Blanchard's helmet skink (Tribolonotus blanchardi) is a species of lizard in the family Scincidae. The species is endemic to the Solomon Islands archipelago.

Etymology
The specific name, blanchardi, is in honor of American herpetologist Frank N. Blanchard.

Geographic range
Within the Solomon Islands archipelago T. blanchardi is found on Bougainville Island, which is governed by Papua New Guinea, and on Choiseul Island, Guadalcanal, and the Nggela Islands, which are governed by the sovereign country of the Solomon Islands.

Habitat

Reproduction
T. blanchardi is oviparous. Clutch size is one egg.

References

Further reading
Burt CE (1930). "Herpetological Results of the Whitney South Sea Expedition IV. Descriptions of New Species of Lizards from the Pacific Islands (Scincidae)". American Museum Novitates (427): 1–3. (Tribolonotus blanchardi, new species, pp. 2–3).
McCoy M (2015). A Field Guide to the Reptiles of the Solomon Islands (pdf). Kuranda, Queensland, Australia: Michael McCoy. 137 pp. 

Tribolonotus
Reptiles of Papua New Guinea
Reptiles of the Solomon Islands
Reptiles described in 1930
Taxa named by Charles Earle Burt